Psoralea cataracta is a species of flowering plant in the genus Psoralea. It was declared extinct in 2008 in the Red Data List of South African Plants, with a single specimen collected from the Tulbagh Waterfall in 1804. It was rediscovered 200 years later by Brian Du Preez in November of 2019 in the Winterhoek Mountains near Tulbagh. It is endemic to the Western Cape. It is also known by the name waterfall fountainbush.

Description 
Psoralea cataracta has small purple flowers dangling on long, thread-like flower stalks.

Distribution 
Psoralea cataracta is found around Tulbagh.

Conservation status 
As of the 2008 classification, Psoralea cataracta is classified as Extinct.

References

External links 
 

Endemic flora of South Africa
Flora of South Africa
Flora of the Cape Provinces
Psoraleeae